Mike Clattenburg is a Canadian television and film director, producer and screenwriter. He is best known as creator, executive producer, writer and director of the TV comedy series Trailer Park Boys (2001–2008), for his work with This Hour Has 22 Minutes (2004), and as the co-creator of the Adult Swim series Black Jesus (2014–2019).

Early life 
A native of Cole Harbour, a suburb of Halifax, Nova Scotia, Clattenburg spent his years after high school as drummer in a Police-inspired rock band, The Spawning Grunions.

He was formerly married to filmmaker Stephanie Joline from 2009 to 2015.

Career 
Clattenburg's jump from music to television began with his co-hosting and production of a Halifax Cable 10 show, That Damn Cable Show, from 1990 to 1993. The program featured on-location interviews and profiles of Halifax entertainers, many of whom were acquaintances of Clattenburg's through his band contacts. Wedged in between the entertainer segments were comedic three-minute clips that displayed his early talent for irreverent film making. That Damn Cable Show was remarkable for its high production values despite being a local cable channel production on a shoestring budget, and made an early name for Clattenburg in film production circles.

Outgrowing the local cable television station, Clattenburg made the move to professional television production with work on comedy and drama programs at CBC Television, including Pit Pony, Street Cents, The Bette Show, and a variety of segments for Sesame Street. His credits include the direction of music videos for Gord Downie, Len, The Tragically Hip, comedy rap group Three Loco, and, most recently, a rap video for Far East Movement featuring Riff Raff of Three Loco.

In addition to Trailer Park Boys and its associated films Trailer Park Boys: The Movie, Trailer Park Boys: Countdown to Liquor Day and Trailer Park Boys 3: Don't Legalize It, Clattenburg also directed the films Afghan Luke and Moving Day, which were released in Toronto and Halifax on July 20, 2012, and the short film Crackin' Down Hard.

He is co-creator, executive producer, co-writer (along with Aaron McGruder), and director of the Adult Swim series Black Jesus, which premiered on August 7, 2014.

He is co-creator (along with Mike O'Neill from Trailer Park Boys), director and an executive producer of Canadian television comedy series Crawford, which premiered as a streaming video on February 2, 2018.

Filmography

References

External links 

Film directors from Nova Scotia
Canadian music video directors
Canadian male screenwriters
Canadian television directors
Canadian television writers
Canadian Screen Award winners
People from Cole Harbour, Nova Scotia
Writers from Halifax, Nova Scotia
20th-century Canadian screenwriters
21st-century Canadian screenwriters
Living people
Year of birth missing (living people)